Dorcadion gashtarovi is a species of beetle in the family Cerambycidae. It was described by Sama, Dascalu and Pesarini in 2010. It is known from Bulgaria and Romania.

See also 
Dorcadion

References

gashtarovi
Beetles described in 2010